Satish is a masculine Indian given name (or patronymic surname). Notable people with the name include:

Satish
Satish K. Agnihotri (born 1956), Indian judge
Satish Chandra, Indian historian
Satish Dhawan, space scientist
Satish Gujral, Indian painter, sculptor, muralist, graphic designer and architect.
Satish Kasetty, Indian Telugu-film director
Satish Kaul, actor in Hindi and Punjabi films
Satish Kaushik, Indian actor in Hindi films
Satish Kumar, Indian film director and actor Uttar Pradesh, India
Satish Mishra, minister in Uttar Pradesh, India, 
Satish Shah, Hindi actor
Satish Sharma, Indian politician
Satish Shetty, social activist
Satish (criminal), Indian serial killer

References

Hindu given names
Indian masculine given names